Pianowo is a village in the administrative district of Gmina Kościan, within Kościan County, Greater Poland Voivodeship, in west-central Poland.

According to 2005 census data, the village has a population of 234.

References

Villages in Kościan County